John McCann may refer to:
Jack McCann (1910–1972), British politician
John McCann (footballer, born 1934), Scottish former professional footballer 
John McCann (footballer, born 1867) (1867–1944), Scottish footballer
John P. McCann (born 1952), cartoon writer and producer
John Paul McCann (1879–1952), British/Irish polo player, competed in the 1908 Summer Olympics
John McCann (Irish politician) (1905–1980), Irish Fianna Fáil politician from Dublin
John McCann, member of the Winchester Three